Stephen Watson (born 18 February 1973 in Durban, South Africa) is a South African racing driver who tested for the Arrows Formula One team in 1998 to 1999. He also competed in International Formula 3000 for three seasons from 1995 to 1997, scoring top 6 finishes on two occasions.

Watson was founding general manager of A1GP, leaving after three years to join the 2010 FIFA World Cup Local Organizing Committee as Tournament Director. In 2009 Watson was Head Hunted by the Gauteng Provincial Government to Head up their international motorsport hosting aspirations. He joined the Gauteng Motorsport Company Which sort to host Formula 1 in the province. A later change in the provincial political leadership and subsequent changes to their strategic objectives, resulted in the project being shelved. Watson continued is employment term within the Gauteng Growth and Development Agency for a further 4 years. In 2013 Watson started his own business ventures and today is the managing director of Discover Digital in South Africa.

Racing record

Complete International Formula 3000 results
(key) (Races in bold indicate pole position; races in italics indicate fastest lap.)

External links
Driver DB Profile

International Formula 3000 drivers
South African racing drivers
Living people
1974 births

Nordic Racing drivers
Durango drivers
Alan Docking Racing drivers
British Formula Three Championship drivers